The 2018 Copa del Rey Juvenil is the 68th staging of the Copa del Rey Juvenil de Fútbol. The competition will start on May 13, 2018.

First round

The top two teams from each group of the 2017–18 División de Honor Juvenil de Fútbol and the two best third-placed teams were drawn into a two-game best aggregate score series. The first leg was played on May 13 and 14 and the return leg on May 19 and 20.

|}

Quarterfinals

The eight winners from the first round advance to quarterfinals, that are played in a two-game series. The first leg were played on May 27 and the second on June 2 and 3.

|}

Semifinals

The four winners from the quarterfinals advance to semifinals, that are played in a two-game series. The first leg was played on June 10 and the second leg bill be played on June 17.

|}

Final

|}

See also
2017–18 División de Honor Juvenil de Fútbol

References

Copa del Rey Juvenil de Fútbol
Juvenil